Santa Catalina Island ( or) is a rocky island off the coast of Southern California in the Gulf of Santa Catalina. The island name is often shortened to Catalina Island or just Catalina. The highest point on the island is Mount Orizaba. Geologically, Santa Catalina is part of the Channel Islands of California archipelago and is the easternmost of the Channel Islands. Politically, Catalina Island is part of Los Angeles County in District 4. Most of the land on the island is unincorporated (governed by the county).

The first Europeans to arrive on Catalina claimed it for the Spanish Empire. Over the years, territorial claims to the island transferred it to Mexico and then to the United States. During this time, the island was sporadically used for smuggling, otter hunting, and gold digging, before successfully being developed into a tourist destination by chewing gum magnate William Wrigley Jr. beginning in the 1920s. Since the 1970s, most of the island has been administered by the Catalina Island Conservancy.

Its total population in the 2010 census was 4,096 people, 90 percent of whom live in the island's only incorporated city, Avalon. The second center of population is the unincorporated village of Two Harbors at the island's isthmus. Development also occurs at the smaller settlements of Rancho Escondido and Middle Ranch. The remaining population is scattered over the island between the two population centers.

History

Archeological evidence shows Native American settlement beginning in 7000 BC. Prior to the modern era, the island was inhabited by the Tongva, who, having had villages Chowigna (San Pedro) and Guashna (Playa del Rey), regularly traveled back and forth to Catalina for trade. The Pimugnans had settlements all over the island at one time or another, with their biggest villages being at the Isthmus and at present-day Avalon, Shark/Little Harbor, and Emerald Bay. The Pimugnans were renowned for their mining, working and trade of soapstone which was found in great quantities and varieties on the island. This material was in great demand and was traded along the California coast.

The first European to set foot on the island was the explorer Juan Rodríguez Cabrillo, who sailed in the name of the Spanish crown.  On October 7, 1542, he claimed the island for Spain and named it San Salvador after his ship. Over half a century later, another Spanish explorer, Sebastián Vizcaíno, arrived at the island on the eve of Saint Catherine's day (November 24) in 1602.  Vizcaino renamed the island in the saint's honor. The colonization of California by the Spanish greatly contributed to the decline of the Pimugnans because of diseases brought by the Spanish from Europe. By the 1830s, the island's entire native population had been forced to the mainland on the Spanish missions or to work as ranch hands for the many private land owners.

Franciscan friars considered building a mission on Catalina, but abandoned the idea because of the lack of fresh water on the island. While Spain maintained its claim on Catalina Island, foreigners were forbidden to trade with colonies. However, it lacked the ships to enforce this prohibition; also, many inhabitants of the colonies wanted to trade with other European powers by themselves, and the island served as home or base of operation for many visitors. Russian hunters from the Aleutian Islands, and America set up camps on Santa Catalina and the surrounding Channel Islands to hunt otters and seals around the island for their pelts. Pirates, of all countries, including Spain, also found that the island's abundance of hidden coves, as well as its short distance to the mainland and its small population, made it suitable for smuggling activities. In the 1850s and 1860s, Catalina was also home to gold miners as the result of a minor gold rush, though evidence that gold was ever on the island is inconclusive.

In 1846, Governor Pío Pico made a Mexican land grant of the Island of Santa Catalina to Thomas M. Robbins, as Rancho Santa Catalina. Robbins established a small rancho on the island, but sold it in 1850 to José María Covarrubias. A claim was filed with the Public Land Commission in 1853, and the grant was patented to José María Covarrubias in 1867. Covarrubias sold the island to Albert Packard of Santa Barbara in 1853. By 1864 the entire island was owned by James Lick, whose estate maintained control of the island for approximately the next 25 years.

By the end of the 19th century, the island was almost uninhabited except for a few cattle herders. The first owner to try to develop Avalon into a resort destination was George Shatto, a real estate speculator from Grand Rapids, Michigan.  Shatto purchased the island for $200,000 (equivalent to $ million in ) from the Lick estate at the height of the real estate boom in Southern California in 1887. Shatto created the settlement that would become Avalon, and can be credited with building the town's first hotel, the original Hotel Metropole, and pier. Despite Shatto's efforts, he defaulted on his loan after only a few years and the island went back to the Lick estate.  The sons of Phineas Banning bought the island in 1891 from the estate of James Lick. The Banning brothers fulfilled Shatto's dream of making Avalon a resort community with the construction of numerous tourist facilities. On November 29, 1915, a fire burned half of Avalon's buildings, including six hotels and several clubs. In the face of huge debt related to the fire and the subsequent decline in tourism due to World War I, the Banning brothers were forced to sell the island in shares in 1919. On May 10, 1912 Glenn L. Martin flew a homemade seaplane in to Avalon, setting records for distance and time.  In 1917 the Meteor Company purchased the Chinese pirate ship Ning Po, the oldest pirate ship afloat, built in 1753, and towed her to the Isthmus of Catalina Island for use as a tourist attraction and restaurant, until destroyed there by fire in 1938.

One of the main investors to purchase shares from the Bannings was chewing-gum magnate William Wrigley, Jr. In 1919, Wrigley bought out nearly every share-holder until he owned controlling interest in the Santa Catalina Island Company. Wrigley invested millions in needed infrastructure and attractions to the island, including the construction of the Catalina Casino which opened on May 29, 1929. Wrigley also sought to bring publicity to the island through events and spectacles. Starting in 1921, the Chicago Cubs, also owned by Wrigley, used the island for the team's spring training. The Cubs continued to use the island for spring training until 1951, except during the war years of 1942 to 1945. Following the death of Wrigley, Jr. in 1932, control of the Santa Catalina Island Company passed down to his son, Philip K. Wrigley, who continued his father's work improving the infrastructure of the island.

During World War II, the island was closed to tourists and used for military training facilities.  Catalina's steamships were expropriated for use as troop transports and a number of military camps were established.  The U.S. Maritime Service set up a training facility in Avalon, the Coast Guard had training at Two Harbors, the Army Signal Corps maintained a radar station in the interior, the Office of Strategic Services did training at Toyon Bay, and the Navy did underwater demolition training at Emerald Bay.

In 1972, the Brown Berets, a group of Latino activists, Chicanos and Mexican residents occupied Santa Catalina Island, invoking the Treaty of Guadalupe Hidalgo, which has no mention of the islands.
On February 15, 1975, Philip Wrigley deeded  of the island from the Santa Catalina Island Company to the Catalina Island Conservancy that he had helped to establish in 1972. This gave the Conservancy control of nearly 90 percent of the island. The balance of the Santa Catalina Island Company that was not deeded to the Conservancy maintains control of much of its resort properties and operations on the island.

Actress Natalie Wood drowned in the waters near the settlement of Two Harbors over the Thanksgiving holiday weekend in 1981 in what was ruled an accidental death. Wood and her husband, Robert Wagner, were vacationing aboard their motor yacht, Splendour, along with their guest, Christopher Walken, and Splendour captain, Dennis Davern. As a result of statements by Davern, and other factors, Wood's death certificate was altered to indicate the cause was "drowning and other undetermined factors"

In May 2007, Catalina experienced the Island Fire, a large wildfire. Largely due to the assistance of 200 Los Angeles County fire fighters transported by U.S. Marine Corps helicopters and U.S Navy hovercraft, only a few structures were destroyed, though  of wildland were burned. In May 2011, another wildfire started near the Isthmus Yacht Club and was fought by 120 firefighters transported by barge from Los Angeles. It was extinguished the next day after burning .

Geology

Catalina is primarily composed of two distinct rock units: Catalina Schist from the Early Cretaceous (95 to 109 million years ago), and Miocene volcanic and intrusive igneous rocks. The island is rich in quartz, to the extent that some beaches on the seaward side have silvery-grey sand. These formations originally occurred on the ocean floor and emerged from the ocean through tectonic activity. This means that the Santa Catalina Island land-mass was never directly connected to mainland California. Other geologic factors that contributed to the island topography include further geologic uplift and subsidence, tectonic plate movement, sedimentation, metamorphic activity, weathering, and erosion.

Climate
Santa Catalina Island has a warm-summer Mediterranean climate (Köppen climate classification Csb) with very mild winters. The National Weather Service maintains cooperative weather records at the Santa Catalina airport. Coastal high fog is common during summer, but usually burns off by the afternoon.

There are an average of 45 days with measurable precipitation. Snowfall is a rarity on the island, averaging only  a year at the airport, but  fell in 1949, including  in January.

Wildlife
Since Catalina Island was never connected to mainland California, it originally lacked any terrestrial life. Any plants or animals that arrived on the island had to make their way across miles of open ocean. The original species to come to the island arrived by chance by blowing over on the wind, drifting or swimming over the ocean, or flown over by wing. Starting with the Native Americans and continuing today, animals and plants have also been introduced by humans, both intentionally or accidentally.

Catalina is home to at least fifty endemic species and subspecies that occur naturally on the island and nowhere else in the world. This limited distribution of a species may result from the extinction of the original population on the mainland combined with its continued survival on the island where there may be fewer threats to its continued existence.

Flora

The most common native plant communities of Catalina Island are chaparral, coastal sage scrub, island oak-ironwood woodland and grassland. Eucalyptus trees are the most common introduced plant.

About 400 species of native plants grow on the island. Six species, subspecies or varieties are endemic and can be found only on Catalina Island. These plants are: Catalina manzanita (Arctostaphylos catalinae); Catalina mahogany (Cercocarpus traskiae); Catalina dudleya (Dudleya hassei); St. Catherine's lace (Eriogonum giganteum var. giganteum); Santa Catalina bedstraw (Galium catalinense ssp. catalinense); and Santa Catalina Island ironwood (Lyonothamnus floribundus ssp. floribundus). A disjunctive population of toyon var. macrocarpa is also a Santa Catalina endemic. These plants may be seen at the island's Wrigley Memorial & Botanical Gardens.

Fauna 

The island is home to five native land mammals: the island fox, the Spermophilus beecheyi nesioticus subspecies of California ground squirrel, the Santa Catalina Island harvest mouse (Reithrodontomys megalotis catalinae), the Santa Catalina Island deer mouse (Peromyscus maniculatus catalinae), and the ornate shrew (Sorex ornatus). Only one ornate shrew was ever found, from a now-developed spring area above Avalon. Shrews are difficult to capture and may survive in wetter areas of the island.

The Catalina orangetip butterfly is a notable insect on the island. The Southern Pacific rattlesnake (Crotalus oreganus helleri) is also present on the island. This species should not be confused for the Santa Catalina rattlesnake, found on Santa Catalina Island, Mexico.

The Catalina Island bison herd consists of American bison maintained and monitored by the Catalina Island Conservancy. In the 1920s to 1930s, several bison were brought onto Catalina Island for a movie. The bison are popular with the tourists and buildings have painted images of bison and bison weather vanes. Over the decades, the bison herd grew to as many as 600. The population currently numbers approximately 150.

Other non-native animals currently living on the island include the blackbuck, bullfrog, feral cat, mule deer, rat, and common starling. Mule deer were introduced to the island in the 1920s and 30s, and currently have a population density roughly 10 times that of California generally. The island was also previously home to populations of cattle, feral goat, feral pig, and sheep, but these animals are no longer present.

According to the Catalina Island Conservancy, there are 37 resident bird species on the island. Considerably more marine, pelagic, and migrating birds frequent the island, and 127 species have been reported to the Cornell University eBird database from 10 different eBird hotspots. There are several live camera feeds showing bald eagle nests on the island; nests are active February–July.

In the waters surrounding the island, there are schools of fish like Garibaldi, California sheephead, leopard sharks, white seabass, yellowtail, bat rays, giant sea bass, and many more. Great white sharks are also occasionally found or caught off the coast of Catalina, though usually around seal rookeries and not around inhabited areas. Common marine mammals around Catalina include California sea lions and harbor seals.

The Catalina macaw, a type of hybrid parrot, was first bred at Catalina Bird Park in 1940 and is named after Santa Catalina Island.

Conservation 
Most of the island is managed by the Catalina Island Conservancy, a private nonprofit organization. The mission of the Catalina Island Conservancy is to be a steward of its lands through a balance of conservation, education and recreation.

One of the Conservancy's key goals is the conservation of the island fox, an endangered endemic species. In 1999, all but 100 out of 1,300 foxes on Catalina Island were wiped out because of a virulent strain of canine distemper. Following a successful recovery program which included captive breeding, distemper vaccinations and population monitoring, the Catalina fox community has been restored to more than 1570 in 2018. However, mysterious, usually fatal ear tumors continue to plague the Catalina fox. Three Catalina Island Conservancy wildlife biologists continue to monitor the population through pit tagging, trapping and inspection. The conservancy group vaccinates around 300 foxes every year and monitors 50 unvaccinated foxes via radio collar to watch for signs of new disease outbreaks. The  current leading cause of death among Island Foxes is road strikes; to combat this, the Conservancy installed new signage about Island Foxes. The Conservancy also introduced wild-life proof trash cans to protect foxes from human garbage, informs boaters about the possibility and danger of wildlife stowaways, and asks dog owners to keep their animals leashed.

The Institute for Wildlife Studies, a separate conservation organization, has worked to restore bald eagles to the island on Conservancy land since the late 1970s. Bald eagles had been common on the island until the 1960s, when it is believed that the effects of dumping the pesticide DDT off the coast of Southern California made it impossible for eagles to successfully hatch their young. The reintroduction of the bald eagle to the island may also edge out an invasive golden eagle population that threatens the native island fox.

Tourism

Over one million people travel to Catalina Island every year, accounting for $166.7 million in annual direct spending on the Island.

Glass bottom boats tour the reefs and shipwrecks of the area, and scuba diving and snorkeling are popular in the clear water. Lover's Cove, to the east of Avalon, and Descanso Beach, to the west of the Casino, are popular places to dive. At Casino Point is the Avalon Underwater Dive Park, which was the first non-profit underwater park in the United States. The area flying fish and the bright orange Garibaldi are attractions. Parasailing is also offered. Jeep and bus tours are given of the interior, which is a conservation area managed by the Catalina Island Conservancy. The Catalina Island Chamber of Commerce & Visitors Bureau operates the official island visitor center and provides visitor services assists tourists with any information on how to get to Catalina Island.

Two Harbors is the second, and much smaller, resort village on the island. Located at the isthmus of the island, northwest of Avalon, it is the primary landing spot for those who wish to tour the western half of the island. It is accessible by boat from San Pedro and by bus or boat from Avalon. While tourists rarely have an opportunity to surf, two beaches on the back side of Catalina offer good waves: Shark Harbor and Ben Weston Beach. There are also two camps, Camp Cherry Valley and Camp Emerald Bay, on the northeastern end of the island that offer summer camps for children and Boy Scouts.

The Catalina Island Museum, formerly located in the historic Catalina Casino but since 2016 in a standalone building, is also an attraction as it is the keeper of the island's cultural heritage with collections numbering over 100,000 items and including over 8,000 years of Native American history, over 10,000 photographs and images, a large collection of Catalina-made pottery and tiles, ship models, and much more. The museum features dynamic exhibits on this history, an art gallery, special exhibitions traveling from around the world, and a unique Museum Store. Programs include First Fridays at the Museum, an annual tour of the historic Tuna Club, a Holiday Symphony Concert, book signings, gallery talks, an annual silent film benefit and more. From 1927 until 1937, pottery and tiles were made on the island at the Catalina Clay Products Company, and these items are now highly sought-after collectibles.

Education
Children in Avalon attend schools in the Long Beach Unified School District. There were two schools on Catalina Island. Two Harbors was served by a one-room school house, but it closed down in 2014; students must now travel to Avalon for all grades K–12.  Avalon schools are housed on one main campus that includes Avalon Elementary School, Avalon Middle School and Avalon High School. Thousands of school-age youths travel from the mainland to study at the Catalina Island Marine Institute every year.

There is also a branch of the County of Los Angeles Public Library system in downtown Avalon, adjacent to the Sheriff's office.

The USC Wrigley Marine Science Center houses research and teaching facilities at Big Fisherman's Cove, near Two Harbors, for the USC Wrigley Institute for Environmental Studies. Maintained by the University of Southern California and named for Philip K. Wrigley, it consists of a  laboratory building, dormitory housing, cafeteria, a hyperbaric chamber, and a large waterfront staging area complete with dock, pier, helipad, and diving lockers. The facility was expanded with a donation from the Wrigley family in 1995. The institute is open for public visits as part of its "Saturdays at the Lab" program.

Sports

Catalina is the starting point for the Catalina Channel swim, the second jewel in the Triple Crown of Open Water Swimming, along with the English Channel, and Manhattan Island.  In 1927, a 17-year-old Canadian swimmer, George Young, became the first person to complete a crossing from Catalina Island to the mainland of California in a time of 15:44.30.  Since then, over 500 men and women have completed the 20.1 mile swim from Doctor's Cove on Catalina to the mainland near Point Vicente Lighthouse and Rancho Palos Verdes.

Infrastructure

Transportation

Catalina is serviced by passenger ferries operated by Catalina Express, Catalina Classic Cruises, and Catalina Flyer. Ferries depart from Long Beach and San Pedro in Los Angeles County as well as Dana Point and Newport Beach in Orange County. The crossing takes approximately an hour.

Helicopter service is also available from Long Beach or San Pedro.

Catalina has also been an active port of call for many cruise lines since the 1990s, with Royal Caribbean, Princess Cruises, and Carnival Cruise Lines making the port a regular stop on Baja cruises. The ships anchor about 1,000 feet off Avalon Harbor. Passengers disembark through shore boat tendering services.

The island is also home to the Catalina Airport (FAA Identifier: AVX), also known as Airport-in-the-Sky. The airport terminal was built in 1946 through the efforts of Dick Probert. The runway was built by Philip Wrigley in 1941, who leveled two adjacent hilltops and filled the canyon between them. It was called Buffalo Springs Airport, and was not opened for public use until 1946. By the 2000s the 3,000' (900m) runway was in serious disrepair, and arrangements were made in 2018 to have the Marines replace it with a concrete runway. The work was performed in January 2019, and the airport was returned to service on 3 May. Until the time of the airport's construction, the only scheduled passenger air service to the island was provided by seaplanes and helicopters at the Pebbly Beach Seaplane Base (FAA Identifier: L11).

The use of motor vehicles on the island is restricted; there is a limit on the number of full-sized vehicles, which translates into a 25-year-long wait list to bring a private car to the island. Most residents use golf carts or mini cars for transportation. Because of these restrictions, there is no regularly scheduled vehicle ferry service. Tourists can hire a taxi from Catalina Transportation Services. Bicycles are also a popular mode of transportation. There are a number of bicycle and golf cart rental agencies on the island. Only the city of Avalon is open to the public without restrictions. The only major road into the back country is Stage Road. Under an agreement with Los Angeles County, the Conservancy has granted an easement to allow day hiking and mountain biking, but visitors must first obtain a permit at the Conservancy's office (on which they declare the parts of the island they intend to visit). Hiking permits are free, whereas bicycle permits are available for a fee.

Communication
Catalina's isolation offered good opportunities to experiment with new communication technologies throughout its history. The first of these communication innovations was the use of pigeons by Catalina's gold prospectors. Homing pigeons delivered messages to the mainland in 45 minutes, compared to 10 days to deliver mail from Isthmus to Wilmington by regular post in 1864. Even today, Avalon Post Office does not match the airmail service enjoyed by the miners. Pigeons were used to deliver messages for Catalina residents until 1899. By 1902, the first commercial wireless telegraph station was built in Avalon where the Chimes Tower now stands.

On July 16, 1920, the world's first commercial wireless radiotelephone toll circuit was opened to the public between San Pedro and Avalon. Designed by and installed under the direction of Western Electric Company/Bell Labs engineer Lewis M. Clement (1892–1979), the system drew other engineers from all over the world to study it. The Avalon telephone directory in 1920 listed 52 subscribers serviced by a manual switchboard. People stood for hours to use this new technology, the only drawback of which was that all conversations could be monitored by anyone listening to their radio. Pacific Telephone & Telegraph Co. solved that problem with the installation of two submarine cables running 23 miles from Avalon to San Pedro in 1923. Another communication first touched Catalina when the world's first commercial microwave telephone system was installed in 1946. Although microwave telephones had been used for wartime applications, this was the first peacetime use of this technology.

Catalina's isolation also left the island as the last central office in the US Bell System to operate entirely using manual switchboard operators. The Catalina Island exchange was converted to dial in 1978. The island shares area code 310 and overlay area code 424 with parts of Ventura and Los Angeles County.

Emergency services
The Los Angeles County Sheriff's Department (LASD) operates the Avalon Station serving Santa Catalina Island.

Fire Protection is provided by the Avalon Fire Department inside city limits, and by the Los Angeles County Fire Department in other areas of the island. Two county fire stations are located on Catalina Island: Station #55 is located just outside Avalon in Avalon Canyon and on-call firefighters staff Station #155 in Two Harbors.

Paramedic and lifeguard services are provided by the County Fire Department's Lifeguard Division, also known as Baywatch. Catalina Island Medical Center, located in Avalon, is the island's only hospital/medical center. It operates around the clock. Baywatch operates Baywatch Rescue/Lifeguard Boats.

Utilities
For decades the water was supplied primarily by a reservoir. Forty percent of drinking water on the island is provided by a desalination plant that opened in Avalon in 2016.

Avalon's sewer system was identified by researchers as the cause of ocean pollution in 2011. Many of the city's century-old clay and metal pipes had deteriorated to the point where they had vanished, allowing human sewage to enter the into the bay. From 2000 to 2013, 11 out of 13 annual reports released by the Natural Resources Defense Council listed Avalon as one of the 10 most chronically polluted beaches in the nation for failing state health tests as much as 73% of the time. In February 2012, a cease and desist order was issued against the City for illegally discharging polluted water into the bay. The city invested $5.7 million on sewer main improvements and inspection and tracking systems. The 2014 report showed that water quality had improved, and Avalon Beach was removed from the list of the most polluted beaches.

In popular culture

Film and television

In its heyday in the 1930s, due to its proximity to Hollywood, Catalina Island was a favored getaway destination for Hollywood stars such as Clark Gable. The island also served as a filming location for dozens of movies.

The 2008 movie Step Brothers features a so-called Catalina Wine Mixer event. While the scene in the movie was filmed at the Trump National Golf Club in Rancho Palos Verdes, the real island can be seen offshore in the background. The movie inspired a real-life Catalina Wine Mixer, hosted by the Catalina Island Company every year.

Video Games 
The island is mentioned in the 2020 action-adventure game The Last of Us Part II, and the Catalina Casino building features as the backdrop of the loading screen after the game is completed.

Music 
In 1920, the song "Avalon", which directly references the town of Avalon on the island, was popularized by Al Jolson.

In 1958, The Four Preps released the song "26 Miles (Santa Catalina)", which reached number two on the Billboard Hot 100 and number six on the Billboard R&B chart.

The 1982 Descendents album Milo Goes to College references a fishing trip to the island in a song named "Catalina".

Computing 
Apple's desktop operating system, macOS Catalina, announced on June 3 2019 at WWDC, is named after this region.

Notable people
 Spencer Davis, musician.
 Author Zane Grey built a home in Avalon, which once served as the Zane Grey Pueblo Hotel.
 Gregory Harrison, actor, was born in Catalina Island.
 Marilyn Monroe lived with her first husband, James Dougherty, in the town of Avalon for several months in 1943.

See also

References

External links

 
 Catalina Island Chamber of Commerce and Visitors Bureau
 Catalina Island Conservancy
 Catalina Island Museum
 Catalina Island Views, California, ca. 1900–1909, The Bancroft Library

 
Car-free zones in the United States
Islands of California
Islands of Los Angeles County, California
Islands of Southern California
Islands of the Channel Islands of California
Los Angeles Harbor Region
Populated places in Los Angeles County, California
Ranchos of Los Angeles County, California
Tourist attractions in Los Angeles County, California